Oscar Robinson (born 2 July 1916, date of death unknown) was a Barbadian cricketer. He played in five first-class match for the Barbados cricket team from 1943 to 1947.

See also
 List of Barbadian representative cricketers

References

External links
 

1916 births
Year of death missing
Barbadian cricketers
Barbados cricketers
People from Saint Philip, Barbados